Ian Shepherdson is a British economist.  He is the founder and chief economist of Pantheon Macroeconomics, an economic research firm located in Newcastle, England, with offices in London and Valhalla, New York. In February 2015, he was named The Wall Street Journal's US economic forecaster of the year for the second time, having previously won the award in 2003.

After graduating from Loughborough University with a B.Sc. in banking and finance and a PhD in economics, Shepherdson began working as chief U.K. economist at HSBC, a position he held for six years. He then moved to the United States, working as chief economist, USA, for HSBC before taking the Chief U.S. Economist role at research firm High Frequency Economics two years later. In 2012, Ian founded his own independent economic research firm, Pantheon Macroeconomics, currently focussed on the U.S., Eurozone, the U.K., Asia, and Latin America.

Ian Shepherdson has been called one of the "best economists in the city" by the London Times and "consistently right" by the New York Times.  He is a member of the Economic Club of New York.

See also
 Pantheon Macroeconomics

References

British economists
Academics of Loughborough University
Living people
Alumni of Loughborough University
Year of birth missing (living people)